Tombs in Iran
Tombs
Iranian Persian people